This is a list of Canadian journalists.

A
 Auguste Achintre – journalist and essayist, deceased
 Charles Adler – Global Sunday, Adler OnLine
 David Akin
 Barbara Amiel – Maclean's, Toronto Sun
 Doris Anderson – Chatelaine, Toronto Star, deceased
 Peter Armstrong – business reporter, former host of CBC Radio's World Report and former foreign correspondent with CBC News
 Sally Armstrong
 Adrienne Arsenault – anchor at CBC-TV "The National". foreign correspondent with CBC News
 Michel Auger – Le Journal de Montréal
 Michel C. Auger – Le Soleil, Radio-Canada, Le Journal de Montréal
 Nahlah Ayed – host of CBC Radio "Ideas" program, foreign correspondent with CBC News, former parliamentary reporter for The Canadian Press

B
 Gary Bannerman – Maclean's, National Post, The Globe and Mail, Toronto Star
 Rosemary Barton – CBC News Senior Politics correspondent
 Anita Bathe - CBC Vancouver reporter and anchor
 David Beers – The Tyee
 Pierre Berton – journalist and historian; deceased
 Christine Birak – CBC health and science reporter
 Shaughnessy Bishop-Stall
 Conrad Black – National Post, National Review
 Christie Blatchford – deceased, formerly with Toronto Sun, National Post, The Globe and Mail
 Keith Boag – retired. Former CBC-TV correspondent.
 Susan Bonner – Host of CBC Radio "World News at 6" program.
 Mark Bourrie
 Amber Bracken - photojournalist
 Laurie Brown – former CBC arts reporter
 Charles Tory Bruce
 Kim Brunhuber – CBC reporter
 Stephen Brunt – sports writer for The Globe and Mail
 Dianne Buckner – host of CBC-TV "Dragons Den, CBC business reporter, former host of Venture
 Stéphan Bureau – Le Téléjournal anchor
 Jennifer Burke – CTV News Channel anchor
 Hugh Burrill – Citytv Toronto sports anchor and reporter, now at Sportsnet

C
 Theo Caldwell – National Post, Sun News Network
 Bill Cameron – CBC Radio, Toronto Star, Maclean's, Global TV, Citytv, CBC TV, National Post, deceased
 Stevie Cameron
 Dalton Camp – Toronto Star columnist, deceased
 Jock Carroll Jock Carroll (March 5, 1919 – August 4, 1995[1]) was a Canadian writer, journalist and photographer who worked for the Canadian media, including the Toronto Telegram.
 Bill Carroll – CFRB radio talk show host
 Henry Champ – CBC News: Morning, deceased
 Andrew Chang - Anchor of CBC-TV "The National"
 Piya Chattopadhyay – Host of CBC Radio "Sunday Morning" program.
 Wei Chen – Canada AM, Toronto 1, CBC
 Ben Chin – CBC, CTV, Toronto 1; now political advisor in Ottawa
 Jojo Chintoh – Citytv reporter
 Adrienne Choquette – various Quebec newspapers and journals, deceased
 Nathalie Chung – RDI / SRC
 Greg Clark – war journalist, deceased
 Tom Clark – retired. Formerly CTV News reporter and host of Global TV  The West Block.
 Adrienne Clarkson – CBC host, Take 30; later Governor General and retired
 David Cochrane, CBC reporter and host of Power & Politics
 Lynn Colliar – former Global BC Noon News Hour anchor
 David Common – CBC reporter
 Brendan Connor
 Terence Corcoran – National Post columnist 
 Michael Coren – Toronto Sun, Crossroads Television
 Andrew Coyne – National Post and member of CBC News' At Issue Panel, former columnist with The Globe and Mail and former editor with MacLean's
 Lynn Crosbie – former CFTO TV reporter
 Bill Cunningham – W5, CBC Newsworld

D
 Mark Dailey – Citytv Toronto anchor/reporter, deceased
 Pauline Dakin – former CBC, now a university journalism professor
 Lindsey Deluce – former CTV Atlantic reporter/anchor; now with CP24
 Randall Denley – Ottawa Citizen
 Monika Deol – former Citytv Vancouver, former host of MuchMusic's Electric Circus
 Bernard Derome – former Radio–Canada Le Téléjournal anchor
 Peter Desbarats – Global News, Toronto Star
 Dave Devall – deceased.  CFTO Toronto (CTV) weatherman
 Rosie DiManno – Toronto Star columnist
 Gordon Donaldson – also a historian
 Robyn Doolittle – investigative reporter for the Globe and Mail, formerly of the Toronto Star 
 Dwight Drummond – CBC Toronto reporter/anchor
 Francis D'Souza – Citytv Toronto reporter/anchor
 Michelle Dubé – CTV reporter and anchor
 Mike Duffy – retired. Former Canadian Senator and former CTV CBC political reporter.
 Eric Duhatschek – The Globe and Mail sportswriter
 Simon Durivage – Le TVA 22 heures anchor

F
 Mohamed Fahmy
 Avis Favaro – CTV News medical specialist
 Nadia Fezzani – magazines and TV documentaries; personalities' interviews on out–of–the–ordinary topics and American serial killers
 Robert Fife – Politics reporter with the Globe &  Mail. Former CTV News Ottawa Bureau Chief.
 Gillian Findlay – CBC, The Fifth Estate
 Mary Lou Finlay – retired. Formerly host of CBC Radio's As It Happens and host of CBC-TV "The Journal".
 Robert Fisher – CBC host; former Global News anchor, former Focus Ontario host
 Diane Francis – National Post reporter
 Whit Fraser – CBC reporter and anchor
 Jesse Freeston – filmmaker and The Real News correspondent, Latin America
 Dawna Friesen – Global National anchor
 Barbara Frum – former CBC the Journal host; deceased
 David Frum – writer for magazine "The Atlantic,  National Post reporter, American Enterprise Institute, former speechwriter for President Bush; son of Barbara Frum
 Melissa Fung – Formey CBC reporter

G
 Vicki Gabereau – former CTV talk show host
 Chris Gailus – Global BC News Hour weeknight anchor
 Céline Galipeau – Le Téléjournal anchor
 Mary Garofalo – host and senior producer of Global's 16x9 – The Bigger Picture
 Hana Gartner – co–host of CBC's the fifth estate, former CBC News reporter
 Françoise Gaudet-Smet - former Quebec journalist
 Jian Ghomeshi – former host of Q on CBC Radio One and CBC TV; British-Canadian broadcaster, writer, and musician
 Brad Giffen – CTV News Channel anchor and Canada AM; former with ABC and Fox in the United States
 Robin Gill – Global National anchor/reporter
 Malcolm Gladwell
 Carol Goar – columnist, and former editorial page editor, Washington bureau chief and national affairs columnist for The Toronto Star
 Michel Godbout – CBMT anchor, CBC News at Six
 Dale Goldhawk – host of Rogers TV Goldhawk Live, former CTV reporter
 Jonathan Goldsbie - The National Post, NOW, Torontoist, Canadaland
 Bill Good – former CBC News Vancouver anchor, Canada Tonight anchor, CTV News at Six Vancouver anchor, CKNW AM 980 talk show host, retired
 Alison Gordon – sportswriter
 Amelia Elizabeth Roe Gordon - editor, White Ribbon Bulletin
 Charles Gordon – Ottawa Citizen columnist
 Melissa Grelo – former Citytv Toronto Reporter; now with CP24

H
 David Halton – former CBC reporter and CBC Washington Bureau Chief
 Daniele Hamamdjian - CTV News
 Annette Hamm – CHCH News morning host/anchor
 Ian Hanomansing – CBC News anchor
 Tom Harrington
 Chantal Hébert – national affairs columnist for the Toronto Star, contributor to the "At Issue" panel on CBC Television's The National
 Doug Herbert – reporter, news anchor, CBC Kamloops
 Cheryl Hickey – host of ET! Canada, former Global News Toronto reporter
 Heather Hiscox – host of CBC News Now, formerly with CHCH in Hamilton, CBC Montreal and the Global Television Network
 John Honderich – former publisher, editor, bureau chief and reporter for the Toronto Star, currently chairman of the board, Torstar Corporation
 Lorne Honickman – Court TV Canada and CP24 host, former Citytv Toronto reporter
 Deborra Hope – Global BC (retired on March 21, 2014) 
 Tina House - APTN
 Rae Hull – CBC and CTV
 Kathryn Humphreys – City Toronto sports specialist and reporter
 Paul Hunter – CBC News reporter and correspondent
 Bob Hunter – former Citytv Toronto reporter; deceased

I
 Marci Ien – Canadian MP and Cabinet Minister. Formerly co-host of CTV The Social and former co-host of Canada AM.

J
 Doug James – former foreign correspondent for CBC and CNN; now freelance writer and voice over artist
 Carolyn Jarvis –  Global's 16x9
 Michaëlle Jean – former Radio Canada television anchor, former host of CBC Newsworld The Passionate Eye; former Governor General of Canada
 Michel Jean – TVA
 Peter Jennings – former anchor, ABC News World News Tonight, former reporter CBC News and CTV News, deceased
 Brian D. Johnson – film critic and entertainment journalist for Maclean's
 George Jonas – former CBC journalist; Toronto Star; The National Post, deceased

K
 Vassy Kapelos – Host of CBC News Now "Power & Politics. Formerly Global News Ottawa bureau chief and host of The West Block 
 Max Keeping – former CTV News Ottawa anchor
 Mark Kelley – CBC reporter and host
 Tom Kennedy – CTV News London correspondent
 Arthur Kent – former CBC reporter; brother of Peter Kent
 Peter Kent – former Global National News Anchor; formerly federal MP from Ontario and Cabinet Minister in the Stephen Harper government; brother of Arthur Kent
 Tanya Kim – former host of CTV etalk and entertainment reporter with CityTV Toronto
 Wab Kinew
 Diana Kingsmill Wright
 Harvey Kirck – former CTV National News anchor; deceased
 Jill Krop – former Global BC News Hour Final anchor, Unfiltered on Global News
 Faisal Kutty – Lawyers Weekly columnist

L
 Lisa LaFlamme – CTV National News anchor
 Andréanne Lafond – former Radio-Canada television host
 Michael Landsberg – sports broadcaster
 Michelle Lang – Calgary Herald reporter killed in Afghanistan
 Linda Leatherdale – former Toronto Sun business editor
 Mi-Jung Lee – former CTV News at 11:30 Vancouver anchor, now reporter at CTV Vancouver
 Avi Lewis – documentary filmmaker, former CBC Counterspin host; grandson of former NDP Leader David Lewis
 Dana Lewis – correspondent for Fox News Channel; former CTV News reporter
 Ezra Levant- Former Sun News Channel host and current head of Rebel News
 Brian Linehan – former Citytv entertainment reporter/interviewer, deceased
 Laura Lynch – CBC radio and television journalist

M
 Gloria Macarenko – former CBC News Vancouver anchor, now host of BC Almanac on CBC Radio One
 Amber MacArthur – former Citytv Toronto (CityNews) new media specialist; now with CP24
 Neil Macdonald – CBC news reporter
 Rick MacInnes-Rae – CBC Radio
 Linden MacIntyre – CBC reporter
 Ron MacLean – CBC News sportcaster
 Marcia MacMillan – CTV News Channel anchor and formerly with The Weather Network
 Carole MacNeil – co–host of CBC News Sunday
 Sheila MacVicar – CBC News reporter
 Hazel Mae – former Sportsnet news anchor; now anchor for NESN
 Rafe Mair – former radio talk show host in Vancouver, former BC Socred MLA
 Victor Malarek – reporter for CTV's W5, former host the fifth estate
 Eric Malling – former host of CTV W5, deceased
 Peter Mansbridge – former CBC News The National anchor
 Don Martin – host of Power Play on CTV Newsnet and former Calgary Herald and National Post reporter and columnist
 Pamela Martin – former CTV News at Six Vancouver anchor, now working with BC Premier Christy Clark
 Gord Martineau – retired journalist and former City Toronto news anchor
 Dan Matheson – CTV News Channel anchor
 Chris Mavridis – CBS News Correspondent; former CFRB Anchor; former Global News Correspondent
 Bob McAdorey – former global entertainment reporter; deceased
 Duncan McCue – CBC television and radio
 Marguerite McDonald – former CBC Radio host, deceased
 Norris McDonald – Toronto Star automotive editor
 Colleen McEdwards – CNN International anchor and correspondent; CBC News Political correspondent (Toronto); CTV News writer
 David McGuffin – CBC News Africa Bureau Chief; former CTV News Beijing bureau chief and Asia correspondent
 Jim McKenny – former Citytv sportcaster, former NHL player
 Bob McKeown – CBC The Fifth Estate and former NBC Dateline reporter
 Ryan McMahon - Comedian, journalist and podcaster
 Anne-Marie Mediwake – anchor, formerly with CBC Toronto and Global Toronto; now co-host of CTV Your Morning
 Carol Anne Meehan
 Wendy Mesley – CBC reporter/anchor, former Undercurrents (CBC current affairs series) host
 Wendy Metcalfe – Toronto Sun and Ottawa Sun editor-in-chief
 Alex Mihailovich – Global 16X9: The Bigger Picture investigative correspondent
 Terry Milewski – retired CBC reporter; occasional fill-in reporter/host with CBC
 Roswell George Mills – Montreal Star, Les Mouches Fantastiques
 Gaëtane de Montreuil – early Canadian woman journalist
 Tracy Moore – host of Cityline, former reporter for Citytv Toronto's Breakfast Television and City News Toronto
 Keith Morrison – Dateline NBC reporter, former Canada AM host
 Jennifer Mossop – former CHCH Hamilton news anchor, former Ontario Liberal MPP
 Anne Mroczkowski – former Global Toronto and CityTV news anchor
 Cynthia Mulligan – City Toronto education specialist
 Jim Munson – former broadcast news and CTV reporter, former director of communications in the Prime Minister's Office of Jean Chrétien, current Liberal senator for Ontario
 Rex Murphy – host of CBC Radio's Cross Country Canada
 Kasia Mychajlowycz - Canadaland, Globe & Mail

N
 Pascale Nadeau – Le Téléjournal anchor
 Joyce Napier
 Knowlton Nash – former CBC National News anchor, former host of Witness (CBC documentary series), deceased
 Farah Nasser – former Citytv Toronto reporter/anchor, CP24. Current co-anchor at Global News Toronto
 Tara Nelson – former Global National reporter/anchor, now CTV News at Six Calgary anchor
 Don Newman – former host of CBCNW Politics
 Kevin Newman – CTV News, former co–host of Question Period; former Global National anchor, former ABC News reporter; former CBC anchor
 Peter C. Newman – Toronto Sun journalist, author, former editor for the Toronto Star
 Elizabeth Nickson – The Globe and Mail columnist

O
 Carol Off – host of As it Happens on CBC Radio
Walter D. O'Hearn – correspondent, editor and later executive director of the Montreal Star
 Craig Oliver – former CTV Ottawa Bureau Chief; now political correspondent and chief parliamentary correspondent
 David Onley – former Citytv Toronto Science and Technology Specialist; CP24 news anchor; later Lieutenant Governor of Ontario
 Seamus O'Regan – former host of Canada AM and now Liberal MP
 Susan Ormiston – CBC host

P
 Steve Paikin – host of TVO's The Agenda with Steve Paikin; formerly with CBC
 Tony Parsons – former BCTV/Global BC News Hour anchor; former CBC Vancouver at Six anchor, retired
 Vic Parsons 
 Jacquie Perrin – CBC
 Angelo Persichilli – Toronto Star columnist, Corriere Canadese editor
 Saša Petricic – CBC The National correspondent
 Aarti Pole – Host CBC News Network; former Global National Washington correspondent
 Dini Petty – former talk show host with Citytv Toronto and CTV
 Bruce Phillips – CTV News (1968–1985)
 Claude Poirier – TVA crime reporter
 Valerie Pringle – former CBC daytime anchor
 Jackson Proskow – Global Nationals Washington Bureau Chief 
 Dina Pugliese – host of City's Breakfast Television; host of Star! Daily
 Karyn Pugliese - APTN
 Belle Puri - CBC Vancouver reporter

R
 Tim Ralfe – CBC reporter
 Troy Reeb – CanWest global vice-president, former Global National reporter, now senior vice president of news for Shaw Media
 Waubgeshig Rice – CBC television and radio journalist
 Graham Richardson – CTV News reporter, former Focus Ontario host
 Daniel Richler – BookTV host, former CBCNW host
 David Ridgen – former CBC investigative, Independent filmmaker
 Sandie Rinaldo – CTV National News weekend anchor
 Leslie Roberts – former Global Toronto anchor
 Lloyd Robertson – former CTV National News anchor; host of W5
 Ann Rohmer – former Citytv Toronto anchor/host; now with CP24
 Teresa Roncon – Discovery Channel Canada, former CFTO Toronto (CTV) reporter
 Scott Russell – CBC Sports reporter

S
 Omar Sachedina – CTV News reporter, former CP24 anchor, former Citytv Toronto reporter
 Morley Safer – reporter and correspondent for CBS News newsmagazine show 60 Minutes and former reporter for the London Free Press
 Percy Saltzman – late CBC weatherman who used to throw his chalk up into the air
 Doug Saunders – columnist and European bureau chief with The Globe and Mail
 Joe Schlesinger – veteran CBC reporter
 Camilla Scott – former talk show host
 Dave Seglins – CBC Radio
 Sid Seixeiro – sportscaster, host of Breakfast Television
 Jeff Semple - Global National reporter and substitute anchor
 Merle Shain
 Alexandra Shimo
 Morton Shulman – former host of The Shulman Files, former Ontario NDP MPP, former Coroner
 Haroon Siddiqui – Editor Emeritus and columnist, The Toronto Star
 Moe Sihota – former host The New VI Victoria, former BC NDP MLA
 Peter Silverman – former Citytv Toronto reporter
 Jeffrey Simpson – columnist, The Globe and Mail
 Katie Simpson – CBC journalist
 Stephen Smart—former CBC British Columbia legislature journalist
 Alison Smith – CBC radio and television anchor
 Danielle Smith
 Gail Smith
 Roger Smith – CTV News reporter
 Linden Soles
 Evan Solomon
 Shirley Solomon – former talk show host
 Eric Sorensen – Global News Washington, D.C. Bureau Chief, former CBC News reporter
 Boris Spremo – photojournalist for the Toronto Star, retired
 Walter Stewart – newspaper, magazine and book–length journalist
 David Suzuki – host of CBC's The Nature of Things
 Diana Swain – CBLT news anchor, The National sub–anchor
 Alexandra Szacka – CBC/Radio-Canada correspondent in Moscow

T
 Jane Taber – reporter, Halifax Bureau of The Globe and Mail and former co–host of Question Period
 Tamara Taggart – CTV News at Six Vancouver anchor (former – was fired May 2018)
 Tanya Talaga – Toronto Star
 Jan Tennant – retired Global Toronto anchor
 Ellie Tesher – advice columnist
 Sophie Thibault – Le TVA 22 heures anchor
 Rosemary Thompson – former Washington correspondent, deputy bureau chief for CTV
 Beverly Thomson – anchor CTV News Network. Formerly host of Canada AM",  Global News Toronto anchor, and former CTV Toronto anchor
 Paula Todd – journalism professor, investigative journalist, non-fiction author
 Asha Tomlinson - Marketplace James Travers – Toronto Star political columnist, deceased
 Anna Maria Tremonti – podcast host. Formerly CBC radio host of The Current, former CBC TV reporter
 Peter Trueman – deceased. original anchor, Global News Sheldon Turcott – CBC The National, deceased
 Garth Turner – former CTV business reporter, former Toronto Sun business reporter, former Conservative and Liberal MP

V
 Jennifer Valentyne – Global Toronto co-host and former CityTV Toronto's Breakfast Television Live–Eye Host
 Michael Valpy – journalist
 Julie Van Dusen – CBC News reporter
 Jim Van Horne – Sportsnet news anchor, former TSN Sportsdesk anchor
 Jody Vance – City Vancouver Breakfast Television co–host and news anchor 
 Ali Velshi – CNN, former CTV Toronto reporter
 Neelam Verma – Sun News Network
 Daiene Vernile

W
 Pamela Wallin – former CBC national magazine anchor and current member of the Senate from Saskatchewan
 Jennifer Ward – CTV News Channel anchor
 Paul Watson – Toronto Star Jack Webster – host of BCTV Webster, deceased
 Kate Wheeler – former CTV Newsnet anchor, former CTV Toronto anchor
 Brian Williams – Canadian sportscaster best known for Olympic coverages, former CBC anchor and current anchor at CTV/TSN
 Fred Williams – former executive of Parliamentary Press Gallery, and journalist to various Canadian newspapers
 Nancy Wilson – former CBC and CTV reporter, anchor, and host
 Paul Workman – CTV News foreign correspondent
 Peter Worthington – Toronto Sun journalist, deceased

XYZ
 Lubor J. Zink – former Toronto Telegram and Toronto Sun'' columnist, deceased
 Moses Znaimer – founder of Citytv, former host

Related links 
 List of Canadian Broadcasting Corporation personalities
 List of CTV personalities
 List of Global Television Network personalities

References

 
Canadian